Nomeny, also Nomény, is a commune in the Meurthe-et-Moselle department in north-eastern France.
South of Nomeny, there is a mediumwave broadcasting station, which works on 837 kHz with 300 kW. It uses two guyed masts with different height, which are both insulated against ground, as antenna. The tallest of them has a height of 160 metres.

See also
 Communes of the Meurthe-et-Moselle department

References 

Communes of Meurthe-et-Moselle
Duchy of Lorraine